Adalbert Zafirov (born 29 September 1969) is a Bulgarian former football centre-back who most recently managed CSKA 1948.

Club career
Zafirov was born in Sofia.

International career
He has been capped for the Bulgarian national team, and was an unused substitute at the 1998 FIFA World Cup.

Coaching career
On 30 March 2010, CSKA Sofia coach Ioan Andone resigned, it was announced that the team will be trained by Adalbert Zafirov until the end of the season.

Zafirov was appointed as head coach of Cherno More Varna in late September 2012, following the resignation of Stefan Genov. However, he was released from his duties in mid December 2012, despite winning his last game in charge of the team - 1–0 against Levski Sofia in the second leg of a Bulgarian Cup match.

In late December 2014, Zafirov became the manager of B PFG club Botev Vratsa, but resigned on 27 April 2015. He had a short managerial stint with CSKA 1948 between early and late August 2016.

References

External links
 
 at immerunioner.de

Living people
1969 births
Association football defenders
Bulgarian footballers
Bulgaria international footballers
PFC CSKA Sofia players
FC Lokomotiv Gorna Oryahovitsa players
FC Lokomotiv 1929 Sofia players
Arminia Bielefeld players
1. FC Union Berlin players
PFC Cherno More Varna players
FC Hebar Pazardzhik players
Anagennisi Deryneia FC players
First Professional Football League (Bulgaria) players
Bundesliga players
Cypriot First Division players
Bulgarian expatriate footballers
Expatriate footballers in Germany
Expatriate footballers in Cyprus
1998 FIFA World Cup players
Bulgarian football managers
PFC Cherno More Varna managers